A Bullfighter's Guide to Space and Love is an EP by the band Havalina.  Serving as a prelude to the album Space, Love, & Bullfighting, this EP features alternate versions of three songs which would appear on the next album.

This is the first release to use the truncated name Havalina, cutting off Rail Co. from the name.

Track listing

CD Release
 "Space and Mexico"
 "You Got Me Cry'n"
 "Worst Days"
 "Radio"
 "Touched by the Moon"

Vinyl Release
Side 1
 "Space and Mexico"
 "You Got Me Cry'n"
 "Abduction of the Bullfighter"
Side 2
 "Worst Days"
 "Radio"
 "Touched by the Moon"

External links
 Commentary on A Bullfighter's Guide to Space and Love

Havalina albums
2001 EPs